The Harrisburg Covered Bridge (also called Pigeon River Covered Bridge, East Fork Bridge or McNutts Bridge) is a historic covered bridge in Sevier County, Tennessee, in the United States. It is located east of Sevierville off U.S. Highway 441. The bridge is a king post truss design and crosses the East Fork of Little Pigeon River.

History
Before the Harrisburg Bridge was built in 1875, the McNutts Bridge, which was washed away during a flood, existed in the same place. In March of that year, the Sevier County Court ordered a panel to be used to carry out and organize the construction of a new bridge. Panel members were J.H. Frame, A.E. Murphy, and D.W. Howard. As usual at the time, the local population contributed to the financing, or provided them with construction material, or worked as an assistant in building the project. The voluntary cash donations totalled $50, with the county's $25 contribution.

Elbert Stephenson early (1850 – 1917) was appointed as head of the new construction project. The early family settled in the area in the 1870s. Many of the family members were trained craftsmen, including carpenters, mill builders, locksmiths and engineers. Elbert participated in 1877, next to the bridge project, with 50 percent of the capital contribution of the Newport Mill by Alexander Umbarger. He was related to ___ wife Clementine (1843 – 1922).

In the late years of the 19th century, the population grew around Harrisburg, and life in the area flourished due to the many local mills and blacksmith workshops. After 1915 a new bypass was built around Harrisburg, the community slowly disappeared as many people moved away.

In 1952 the bridge was stabilized with the help of a concrete bridge pillar attached to the building framework.

In the 1970s, the overall state of the bridge had deteriorated so much that it was thought to demolish it, until the organization Daughters of the American Revolution raised the necessary financial resources to rehabilitate the bridge by donating revenue. It was also the organization that made the request to include the bridge in the National Register of Historic Places, which succeeded on June 10, 1975 (NRHP-ID 75001777).

In 1983 the bridge was re-established, but it was noted on the bridge that the crossing for vehicles must not exceed the permissible total weight of three tons.

In 2004 various repairs were carried out on the bridge. After this further renovation, the permissible total weight was increased to 15 tons. As of 2010, an average of 20 vehicles per day crossed the bridge.

Construction details
The building material of the walls consists partly of tinplate.

See also
National Register of Historic Places listings in Sevier County, Tennessee
List of bridges on the National Register of Historic Places in Tennessee
List of covered bridges in Tennessee

References

External links 

 

Bridges completed in 1875
Buildings and structures in Sevier County, Tennessee
Covered bridges on the National Register of Historic Places in Tennessee
1875 establishments in Tennessee
Wooden bridges in Tennessee
National Register of Historic Places in Sevier County, Tennessee
Road bridges in Tennessee
King post truss bridges in the United States